The Hull Philharmonic Orchestra (colloquially known as The Hull Phil) is an amateur orchestra based in Kingston upon Hull, England. Andrew Penny has been its musical director and conductor since 1982.

References

External links 
 Hull Philharmonic Orchestra Website

English orchestras
Culture in Kingston upon Hull
Organisations based in the East Riding of Yorkshire
Tourist attractions in Kingston upon Hull